Janie Jones was an English singer.

Janie Jones may also refer to:

"Janie Jones" (song), a 1977 song by the English punk rock band The Clash from their eponymous debut album 
Janie Jones (film), a 2010 American drama film by writer/director David M. Rosenthal

See also
Jane Jones (disambiguation)